Dead Husbands is a 1998 Canadian-American made-for-television black comedy film starring Nicollette Sheridan, John Ritter, Sonja Smits, Donna Pescow, Amy Yasbeck and Sheila McCarthy. It was directed by Paul Shapiro and written by Bob Randall and Warren Taylor.

Cast

External links

1998 television films
1998 films
1990s black comedy films
American black comedy films
Canadian black comedy films
English-language Canadian films
USA Network original films
American drama television films
1990s American films
1990s Canadian films